George Grüner (born 4 January 1943) is a Hungarian-American physicist, Distinguished Professor of Physics at the University of California, Los Angeles, UCLA.

Education and career
George Grüner attended the Eötvös Loránd University, obtaining his obtaining his B.S. degree in 1967. Upon graduation he joined the Central Research Institute of Physics (KFKI) in Budapest as Research Associate. He received his Ph.D. in 1972, and from 1972 to 1973 he was a postdoctoral associate at Imperial College, London. From 1972 to 1980 he directed a research group at KFKI. In 1981 he was appointed Professor of Physics at UCLA and since 1987, has held the Distinguished Professor title there.

Research
His research areas include the investigation of electron states of matter, nanotechnology, and bioelectronics. He made contributions to the understanding of the interaction between electrons and how they generate new electronic states of materials. His research group has designed, developed and used spectroscopic methods to explore electron liquid, electron crystal, and electron glass states in materials. Recently he worked in the area called nanotechnology, exploring the properties of networks built of nanoscale wires called nanonets. He has used these as scaffolds for anchoring functional materials, thus creating new materials structures with specific attributes needed for applications in biotechnology, printed electronics, energy storage and generation. He is the author of more than 400 research articles, published with approximately 1000 coauthors. He has been one of the most highly cited scientists in the world with about 35,000 citations to his work.

Commercialization
From 2001 to 2005 he was Chief Technology Officer and Chief Scientist of Nanomix, a company developing nanoscale biosensors based on electronic detection. As inventor of the underlying technology, he took responsibility for developing the company's first product and its intellectual portfolio. In 2005 he founded Unidym, a company specializing in carbon-based electronics. As Chief Executive Officer and then Chief Scientist, he steered the company through its first funding round and its initial phase of technology and business development. He is the inventor and co-inventor of more than 25 issued patents and more than 50 patent applications.

Publishing and editorial work
He is the author, co-author or editor of several books. He is editor-in-chief of the Institute of Physics journal Translational Materials Research and serves on the editorial board of the journal Nanotechnology.

Recognitions
Awards

Guggenheim Fellow 1998 • Honorary Professor Technical University of Budapest 1992 • Member of the Hungarian Academy of Sciences 1990 • Elected Fellow of the American Physical Society 1988 • Alexander von Humboldt Senior American Scientist Award 1984 • Technology Pioneer, World Economic Forum 2004 and 2008.

Selected engagements

2003 "Emerging Technologies" Lecture World Economic Forum Davos • 2007 Cheng Tsang Man Visiting Professor NTU • 2008 Technology Panel, World Economic Forum Davos • 2009 Distinguished Technology Panel, Global Competitiveness Forum Riyadh • 2011 Distinguished Visiting Professor King Abdullah University Jeddah • 2012 Distinguished Lecture in Physics Hong Kong University • Visiting professor at the University of Stuttgart, the École Polytechnique Fédérale de Lausanne, the University of Augsburg, ETH Zurich, the University of Groningen and the University of Genoa, in addition to having held visiting positions at Imperial College London and the Max Planck Society.

References

Year of birth missing (living people)
Living people
20th-century Hungarian physicists
21st-century American physicists
University of California, Los Angeles faculty
Eötvös Loránd University alumni
Academic staff of the University of Stuttgart
Academic staff of the École Polytechnique Fédérale de Lausanne
Academic staff of the University of Augsburg
Academic staff of ETH Zurich
Academic staff of the University of Groningen
Hungarian editors
Fellows of the American Physical Society